Adel Khamis (born November 11, 1965) is a retired Qatari footballer.

Career
Khamis started his career in the youth teams of Al Gharafa in 1979. He eventually progressed to the senior squad in 1983, when the team was in the Qatari Second Division. He made his debut for the Qatar national team in 1984 under coach Evaristo de Macedo, when he was just 18 years old. He was the first Qatari footballer to play abroad, appearing for Kuwait's Qadsia from 1997 to 1998. He retired from international football in 2000 following a farewell match against Sudan.

References

1965 births
Living people
Qatari footballers
Qatar international footballers
Al-Gharafa SC players
Qadsia SC players
Qatar Stars League players
Qatari expatriate footballers
Association football defenders
Expatriate footballers in Kuwait
Qatari expatriate sportspeople in Kuwait
Footballers at the 1994 Asian Games
Asian Games competitors for Qatar
Kuwait Premier League players
1988 AFC Asian Cup players
1992 AFC Asian Cup players